Force Field is the seventh studio album by American rock band The Atomic Bitchwax. It was released December 8, 2017 through Tee Pee Records.

Track listing

References 

2017 albums
The Atomic Bitchwax albums
Tee Pee Records albums